Alejandro 'Álex' Ortiz Ramos (born 25 September 1985) is a Spanish professional footballer who plays as a central defender.

Club career
Born in Seville, Andalusia, Ortiz played reserve team football with both Sevilla FC and Real Betis. On 10 February 2008, whilst at the service of the latter club, he appeared in his first and only La Liga game, featuring the full 90 minutes in a 3–1 away loss against Valencia CF.

After being released by the Verdiblancos in June 2010, Ortiz resumed his career in the Segunda División, successively representing Gimnàstic de Tarragona, CD Guadalajara, Deportivo Alavés and CD Mirandés. He scored his first goal as a professional on 17 March 2012 to help Gimnàstic defeat hosts FC Cartagena 3–1 after coming on as a 26th-minute substitute for Sergio Juste, but the season eventually ended in relegation.

References

External links

1985 births
Living people
Spanish footballers
Footballers from Seville
Association football defenders
La Liga players
Segunda División players
Segunda División B players
Tercera División players
Sevilla Atlético players
CD Alcalá players
Betis Deportivo Balompié footballers
Real Betis players
Gimnàstic de Tarragona footballers
CD Guadalajara (Spain) footballers
Deportivo Alavés players
CD Mirandés footballers
Real Murcia players
CD Utrera players